Independent Civil Party (in Spanish: Partido Civil Independiente) was a political party in Peru.  It was founded in 1911. The president of the party was Enrique Barreda y Osma.

Defunct political parties in Peru
Political parties established in 1911
Political parties with year of disestablishment missing